Halych urban territorial hromada is a hromada (municipality) in Ukraine, in Ivano-Frankivsk Raion of Ivano-Frankivsk Oblast. The administrative center is the city of Halych.

Until 18 July 2020, the hromada belonged to Halych Raion. The raion was abolished in July 2020 as part of the administrative reform of Ukraine, which reduced the number of raions of Ivano-Frankivsk Oblast to six. The area of Halych Raion was merged into Ivano-Frankivsk Raion.

Settlements 
The municipality consists of 1 city (Halych) and 25 villages:
 Bliudnyky
 Bryn
 Vysochanka
 Viktoriv
 Hannivtsi
 Demeshkivtsi
 Dorohiv
 Zalukva
 Kozyna
 Kolodiiv
 Komariv
 Krylos
 Kurypiv
 Medynia
 Nimshyn
 Ostriv
 Perlivtsi
 Poplavnyky
 Prydnistrovia
 Pukasivtsi
 Sapohiv
 Sokil
 Subotiv
 Temyrivtsi
 Shevchenkove

References

External links 
 

Ivano-Frankivsk Raion
Hromadas of Ivano-Frankivsk Oblast
2020 establishments in Ukraine